The 1887 Canadian federal election was held on February 22, 1887, to elect members  of the House of Commons of Canada of the 6th Parliament of Canada.

The Conservative Party of Prime Minister Sir John A. Macdonald  retained power, defeating the Liberal Party of Edward Blake.

National results

Note:

* Party did not nominate candidates in the previous election.

Acclamations:

The following Members of Parliament were elected by acclamation:
 British Columbia: 1 Conservative
 Manitoba: 1 Liberal-Conservative
 Quebec: 1 Conservative, 3 Liberals

Results by province

See also
 
List of Canadian federal general elections
List of political parties in Canada
6th Canadian Parliament

Notes

References 

 Federal
1887
February 1887 events